Shafiul Islam Shuhas (born: 6 October 1989) is a Bangladeshi cricketer. A right-arm fast-medium bowler, Shafiul has played for Rajshahi Division since 2006.

Domestic career
The Bangladesh Cricket Board founded the six-team Bangladesh Premier League in 2012, a twenty20 tournament to be held in February 2011. An auction was held for teams to buy players, and Shafiul was bought by the Khulna Royal Bengal for $65,000. He was the team's fourth-highest wicket-taker with five wickets from seven matches. In April the BCB upgraded Shafiul' central contract from grade C to grade B.

He was the leading wicket-taker for Agrani Bank Cricket Club in the 2017–18 Dhaka Premier Division Cricket League, with 24 dismissals in 13 matches.

In October 2018, he was named in the squad for the Rangpur Riders team, following the draft for the 2018–19 Bangladesh Premier League.

In March 2019, bowling for Mohammedan Sporting Club against Gazi Group Cricketers in the opening round of the 2018–19 Dhaka Premier Division Cricket League, Shafiul took his first five-wicket haul in List A cricket. In November 2019, he was selected to play for the Khulna Tigers in the 2019–20 Bangladesh Premier League.

International career
Shafiul received his first international call-up when he selected for Bangladesh's squad for a tri-series with India and Sri Lanka in January 2010. He was the only player in Bangladesh's squad with no prior international experience, but his selection was based on his performance in Bangladesh's domestic league.

He made his One Day International debut on 4 January 2010 against Sri Lanka. He opened the bowling with Rubel Hossain and conceded 39 runs from 5 over. He managed to take one wicket, that of Kumar Sangakkara who was caught behind for 74. After taking a wicket in each of his first two ODI matches against, he was named in a 14-man Test squad to play India later that month. He made his Test debut on 17 January and opened the bowling with Shahadat Hossain; India won by 113 runs and Shafiul's maiden wicket was that of Gautam Gambhir.

In the space of a month, Shafiul twice conceded more than 90 runs in an ODI, first against Pakistan in June 2010 and then against England in July. Consequently, he holds the record for most and second-most expensive bowling figures by a Bangladesh player in ODIs.

Bangladesh hosted the 2011 World Cup in February, March, and April along with India and Sri Lanka. Shafiul was selected in Bangladesh's 15-man squad. On 11 March, Shafiul shared in a 58-run partnership for the ninth wicket to help Bangladesh to victory over England by two wickets. After the match, Bangladesh fans chanted "Bangladesh, Bangladesh  Shafiul is the real hero". After the match, Shafiul and Mahmudullah were given 1 million taka for their match-winning partnership. Imrul Kayes was named man of the match, although he opined that "The last match Man-of-the-Match award was given to me but I did not deserve it. It was Shafiul who should have got it." The captain, Shakib Al Hasan praised Shafiul's performance and his bowling in the following match against the Netherlands. A foot injury meant Shafiul missed both the Tests against the West Indies in November 2011.

In December 2018, he was named in Bangladesh's team for the 2018 ACC Emerging Teams Asia Cup.

Playing style
Champaka Ramanayake, Bangladesh's bowling coach when Shafiul started playing for the team, commented that "Shafiul has lot of skill; has a very good slow bouncer and can bowl the yorker also. He has to be given enough chances to shine and we are very confident that he will come through". He generally bowls at the same length, and the national selectors feel that he needs to vary his bowling more to be effective at Test level.

References

External links

1989 births
Living people
Bangladeshi cricketers
Bangladesh Test cricketers
Bangladesh One Day International cricketers
Bangladesh Twenty20 International cricketers
Bangladesh North Zone cricketers
Bangladesh East Zone cricketers
Bangladesh A cricketers
Fortune Barishal cricketers
Cricketers at the 2011 Cricket World Cup
Chattogram Challengers cricketers
Khulna Tigers cricketers
Prime Doleshwar Sporting Club cricketers
Rajshahi Division cricketers
Sheikh Jamal Dhanmondi Club cricketers
Agrani Bank Cricket Club cricketers
Mohammedan Sporting Club cricketers
People from Bogra District